Stephen Mark Thompson Jr., (born March 23, 1997) nicknamed "Stevie", is an American–Puerto Rican professional basketball player for Bnei Herzliya of the Israeli Basketball Premier League. He played college basketball for the Oregon State Beavers, and declared for the 2017 NBA draft.

Early life and high school
He was born in Harbor City, California, to Stephen and Amy Thompson.

He played basketball at Bishop Montgomery High School in Torrance, California (2015). He was named CIF Southern Section Division IV High School Player of the Year by the John R. Wooden Award Committee. He set school records for career points (2,246), season points (803), season scoring average (24.4), and career wins (114). As a senior, he averaged 24.4 points, 4.8 rebounds, 5.2 assists, and 2.6 steals. As a junior he was named First Team All-State. He was named First Team All-Del Rey League as a sophomore, junior and senior. He graduated with a 4.33 GPA.

College
He played college basketball for the Oregon State Beavers, and declared for the 2017 NBA draft.

As a freshman he averaged 10.6 points, 1.9 rebounds, 0.8 assists, and 1.2 steals per game.  As a sophomore he averaged 16.3 points (6th in the  Pac-12), 4.3 rebounds, 3.0 assists, and 1.4 steals (7th) per game. He was named to the Pac-12 All-Academic First Team.

As a junior he averaged 15.8 points (10th), 3.1 rebounds, 3.3 assists, and 1.7 steals (3rd) per game. He was named to the National Association of Basketball Coaches (NABC) Honors Court, the CoSIDA Academic All-District 8 First Team, and the Pac-12 All-Academic First Team. As a senior he averaged 16.1 points (9th), 4.2 rebounds, 3.2 assists, and 1.5 steals (5th) per game. He was named to the All-Pac-12 Second Team, the NABC All-District 20 Second Team, named the Pac-12 Scholar-Athlete of the Year, and named to the CoSIDA Academic All-District 8 First Team and the Pac-12 All-Academic First Team.  Finished his Oregon State career fourth all-time in scoring (1,767), first in 3-pointers made (230), and tied for eighth in steals (177).

He earned his Oregon State bachelor’s degree in Digital Communication Arts in three years. He then pursued a master’s degree in Interdisciplinary Studies with a focus in Speech Communication and Sociology.

Professional career

Wisconsin Herd (2019–2020) 
On October 28, 2019, Thompson was named to the training camp roster of the Wisconsin Herd of the NBA G League. He played in three games for the team.

Erie Bayhawks (2020) 
On February 4, 2020, Thompson was signed by the Erie BayHawks of the G League. He played in one game for the team. He was waived on February 14.

Stella Azzurra Roma (2020–2021) 
Thompson signed with Stella Azzurra Roma of the Serie B Basket on August 1, 2020. In 2020–21 he averaged 21.4 points (3rd in the league), 5.4 rebounds, and 2.1 steals (leading the league) per game.

Reggio Emilia (2021–2022) 
On July 16, 2021, Thompson signed in the highest Italian competition, in the Serie A for Reggio Emilia a two years contract with exit option in 2022.

Bnei Herzelia (2022–present) 
On November 23, 2022, Thompson signed with Bnei Herzliya of the Israeli Basketball Premier League.

FIBA senior team competitions
Thompson played in the 2021 Americas World Cup Qualifier, and the 2022 FIBA AmeriCup.

Career statistics

College

|-
| style="text-align:left;"| 2015–16
| style="text-align:left;"| Oregon State
|| 32 || 5 || 21.7 || .405 || .375 || .691 || 1.9 || .8 || 1.2 || .3 || 10.6
|-
| style="text-align:left;"| 2016–17 
| style="text-align:left;"| Oregon State
|| 26 || 26 || 36.2 || .397 || .341 || .634 || 4.3 || 3.0 || 1.4 || .2 || 16.3
|-
| style="text-align:left;"| 2017–18 
| style="text-align:left;"| Oregon State 
|| 32 || 32 || 36.6 || .461 || .348 || .657 || 3.1 || 3.3 || 1.7 || .3 || 15.8
|-
| style="text-align:left;"| 2018–19
| style="text-align:left;"| Oregon State
|| 31 || 31 || 36.6 || .428 || .308 || .755 || 4.2 || 3.2 || 1.5 || .2 || 16.1
|- class="sortbottom"
| style="text-align:center;" colspan="2"| Career
|| 121 || 94 || 32.6 || .425 || .340 || .681 || 3.3 || 2.6 || 1.5 || .3 || 14.6

Personal life
He is the son of former NBA player Stephen Thompson and Amy Thompson. His brother, Ethan, also played for the Oregon State Beavers men's basketball team.

References

External links
Oregon State Beavers bio

1997 births
Living people
A.S. Stella Azzurra players
American expatriate basketball people in Italy
American men's basketball players
American people of Puerto Rican descent
Basketball players from Los Angeles
Bnei Hertzeliya basketball players
Oregon State Beavers men's basketball players
Pallacanestro Reggiana players
People from Harbor City, Los Angeles
Point guards
Puerto Rican expatriate basketball people
Puerto Rican men's basketball players
Shooting guards